Théo Druenne (born 19 July 2005) is a Monegasque swimmer. He competed in the 2020 Summer Olympics. He took the 28th place for the men’s 1500 m freestyle.

Life 
Théo Druenne was born on 19 July 2005 in Monaco. He trains at the Louis-II stadium in Monaco and swims roughly 12 km per day. In the build-up to the 2020 Olympic Games in Tokyo his training load gradually decreased to around 5 km per day. He enjoys spending time with his best friends Luc Vitali, Ethan Faloppa, Issei Kim and his girlfriend Giulia Viacava.

2020 Summer Olympics 
Théo Druenne was selected to represent Monaco at the Olympic Games 2020 in Tokyo engaged in 1500 m, freestyle. Druenne was the youngest member of the Monegasque delegation.

Druenne swam his 1500m freestyle heat in 16'17 ”20. He beat his personal best result by 20 seconds, achieved at the European Junior Championships in Budapest in May 2020 (16'37 ”80). With this result, Druenne took the 28th place at the Olympic Games.

References

2005 births
Living people
Swimmers at the 2020 Summer Olympics
Monegasque male swimmers
Olympic swimmers of Monaco
Swimmers at the 2022 Mediterranean Games
Mediterranean Games competitors for Monaco